Howden is a town and civil parish in the East Riding of Yorkshire, England.

Howden may also refer to:

Places
Howden, Tasmania, Australia
Howden, Manitoba, a settlement in Canada
Howden, Livingston, an area of Livingston, West Lothian, Scotland
Howden House (West Lothian)
Howden Edge, a peak in the Peak District National Park, England
Howden Reservoir, England
Howden-le-Wear, County Durham, England
RNAS Howden, airship station, England

People
 Baron Howden, an Irish and British Peerage title
 Brett Howden (born 1998), Canadian ice hockey player
 Harry Howden (1876–1922), Australian golfer
 James Howden (1832–1913), Scottish engineer
 James H. Howden (1860–1938), Canadian politician
 James Howden (rugby union) (1900–1978), New Zealand rugby union player
 Jim Howden (golfer) (1878–1921), Australian golfer
 Jim Howden (rower) (1934–1993), Australian rower
 John Power Howden (1879–1959), Canadian MP
 Peter Howden (1911–2003), New Zealand cricketer
 Quinton Howden (born 1992), Canadian ice hockey player
 Robert Howden (1917–2004), South African cricketer
 Roger of Howden (fl. 1174–1201), 12th-century English chronicler
 Ron Howden (born 1967), British Nordic skier

Other
 Howden, a manufacturer of heavy-duty air and gas handling equipment that merged with Charter Consolidated

See also 
 Howdon, Tyne and Wear, England
 Howdenshire, East Riding of Yorkshire, England